The Makgabeng dwarf gecko (Lygodactylus montiscaeruli) is a species of lizard in the family Gekkonidae. The species is endemic to South Africa.

Habitat
The preferred natural habitats of L. montiscaeruli are rocky areas and savanna.

Description
L. montiscaeruli has 7 to 8 precloacal pores.

Reproduction
L. montiscaeruli is oviparous.

References

Further reading
Jacobsen NHG (1992). "New Lygodactylus taxa (Reptilia: Gekkonidae) from the Transvaal". Bonner zoologische Beiträge 43 (4): 527–542. (Lygodactylus nigropunctatus montiscaeruli, new subspecies, pp. 532–537, Figures 1–2).
Röll B (2018). "Tagaktive, kleine Geckos – die Gattung Lygodactylus". Reptilia 23 (132): 16–23. (in German).
Travers SL, Jackman TR, Bauer AM (2014). "A molecular phylogeny of Afromontane dwarf geckos (Lygodactylus) reveals a single radiation and increased species diversity in a South African montane center of endemism". Molecular Phylogenetics and Evolution 80: 31–42. (Lygodactylus montiscaeruli, new status).

Lygodactylus
Reptiles described in 1992
Taxa named by Neils Henning Gunther Jacobsen